Imentet (Ament, Amentet or Imentit, meaning "She of the West") was a goddess in ancient Egyptian religion representing the necropolises west of the Nile.

She was the consort of Aqen, a god who guided Ra through parts of the underworld. Although she was never officially worshipped, she was mentioned in various hymns and passages of the Book of the Dead.

Role 
As goddess of the deceased, she lived in a tree looking out at the entrance to the Duat (underworld). Her main job, other than being a minor fertility goddess, was to offer food and drink to the newly dead, which would restore their spirits enough to travel to the "field of reeds" which is often equated with paradise in ancient Egyptian religion by modern authors, however, she was so closely linked with Hathor and Isis in their afterlife roles that she may be less an independent deity than an alternate form of those two goddesses.

Appearance 

She was usually depicted in a red sheath dress wearing the hieroglyph for "west" on her head and a sceptre and an ankh in her hands.  She often appears in tombs welcoming the deceased into the afterlife, sometimes with wings, and sometimes as a kite because of her connection to Isis and Nephthys.

Name 
Her title "She of the West" is not just a statement related to geography, but also related as her role in mythology because, as the sun sets towards the west, it was to be accompanied by death, which was where Imentet usually reigned. Additionally, amenti (or amentet) was thought to be where the sun set, and where the entrance to the Underworld was located, although later the term began to associate itself with graveyards and tombs as well.

References

Egyptian goddesses
Fertility goddesses
Hathor
Isis